Inline is commonly used to mean "in a line", "aligned" or "placed within a line or sequence". Topics that feature "inline" in their names include:

 Inline citation (here meaning "within a line of text")
 Inline engine
 Inline hockey
 Inline skating

Computing

 Inline assembler
 Inline expansion
 Inline function in C and C++
 Inline reply
 Inline tag (HTML)

See also 
 In Line, an album by jazz guitarist Bill Frisell released in 1983.